Sean Hankinson is an American actor.

Hankinson was born and raised in Tucson, Arizona, living briefly in Albuquerque, New Mexico, before moving to Los Angeles, California. He attended Tucson High Magnet School, a performing arts public school. During college, he won an OC Weekly award for the title role in Equus, a performance the Los Angeles Times called "both intricate and thorough".

Filmography

Film

Television

Video Games

References

External links
 
 

1986 births
American male actors
Living people
Male actors from Tucson, Arizona